Live @ Warp10 is a collection of songs recorded during the performance of Scottish electronic music duo Boards of Canada at the Warp Records 10th anniversary party. The performance took place at the Chainstore, Trinity Buoy Wharf, London. The WARP 10th birthday live performances were broadcast live on the internet by Gaia Live (gaialive.com) and produced on location by Tim Read.

The collection is notable in that it features two songs that had not been heard before; the names of the tracks are still unknown. As a result of its recording process, the collection is not endorsed by Boards of Canada. Also, the track "The Color of the Fire" is not the same as heard on Music Has the Right to Children, it is an entirely different track. It was mislabeled when the MP3's were released and has not been changed since.

Track listing
 "Zoetrope" – 5:11
 "Happy Cycling" – 7:27
 "The Color of the Fire" – 1:14
 "Telephasic Workshop + The Smallest Weird Number" – 8:10
 "Aquarius" – 7:43
 Unknown – 2:55
 Unknown – 11:27

Personnel

Boards of Canada
 Michael Sandison – performer
 Marcus Eoin – performer

Technical
 Michael Sandison – producer
 Marcus Eoin – producer

See also
 Concert
 Bootleg recording

Notes

External links
 Boards of Canada homepage
 Gaia Live homepage

1999 live albums
Boards of Canada albums
Bootleg recordings